This is a list of seasons played by Zaragoza CFF, a Spanish women's football club based in Zaragoza (Aragón) formerly known as CD Transportes Alcaine, from its foundation in 2002.

Summary

Zaragoza CFF
Zaragoza CFF
Association football lists by Spanish club